Laura Cardoso (born 28 March 2005) is a Brazilian cricketer who plays for the women's national cricket team as a right-arm medium fast bowler and right handed batter. In 2021, aged 16, she became the first cricketer, male or female, to take a hat-trick for Brazil in a Twenty20 International (T20I).

Early life
Cardoso has been involved in sport since she was very young. Initially, she played volleyball. At about the age of 11, she switched to cricket, and joined a community cricket project called . By the time she was 12, she was displaying exceptional talent for the game.

International career
In January 2020, Cardoso was one of the first 14 cricketers, all of them female, to be centrally contracted by Cricket Brasil. Determined not to let the opportunity slip, she became even more disciplined in her approach to the balancing of cricket's demanding schedule with her school commitments.

Even before making her international debut, she was being described as the national team's "premier allrounder", like her idol Ellyse Perry.

In October 2021, Cardoso was selected in Brazil's squad for the ICC Women's T20 World Cup Americas Qualifier, to be held in Naucalpan, Mexico. Ahead of the tournament, her captain, Roberta Moretti Avery, was lauding her as "a gun". Cardoso made her Women's Twenty20 International (WT20I) debut for Brazil in the first match of the tournament, against the United States, on 18 October 2021. She took one wicket for six runs in two overs. Three days later, in Brazil's second match against the United States, she took 3/24.

On 25 October 2021, in Brazil's final match of the tournament, against Canada, Cardoso's performance was even more impressive. With Canada poised at 46/5 and needing just three runs in the final over for victory, Moretti Avery threw Cardoso the ball. After beginning the over with a dot delivery, Cardoso watched Canada lose its sixth wicket to a run out off her second ball. She then proceeded to take a hat trick with her third, fourth and fifth deliveries.

Cardoso thus became the first cricketer, male or female, to take a hat-trick for Brazil in a T20I. Brazil then won the match, by taking Canada's final wicket with a run out off the final ball of the innings, to end what has been dubbed the most dramatic over in Brazilian cricket history. Cardoso finished the match with 3/8 and the player of the match award. She also completed the tournament with a total of 11 wickets, the most of any of the bowlers, from her six matches.

In May 2022, Cardoso and Moretti Avery were recruited to play in the privately-run 2022 FairBreak Invitational T20 in Dubai, United Arab Emirates. They were both allocated to the Barmy Army team.

See also 
 List of Brazil women Twenty20 International cricketers

References

External links 
 

Living people
2005 births
Brazilian women cricketers
Brazil women Twenty20 International cricketers